Bosia is a comune (municipality) in the Province of Cuneo in the Italian region Piedmont, located about  southeast of Turin and about  northeast of Cuneo.

Bosia borders the following municipalities: Borgomale, Castino, Cortemilia, Cravanzana, Lequio Berria, and Torre Bormida.

History 

The village of Bosia once stood in a different place. It was rebuilt on its current site - where a village called Rutte was - after a massive landslide on 8 April 1679 killed 200 inhabitants when the village suddenly sank.

References 

Cities and towns in Piedmont